Robert Fresco may refer to:

Robert M. Fresco (1930–2014), American screenwriter and film producer
Robert Fresco (cinematographer) (born 1943), Canadian cinematographer and documentary filmmaker